Patrik Nordgaard (born 18 March 1980) is a Swedish retired bandy player who last played for Hammarby as a goalkeeper.

Career

Club career
Nordgaard has represented Helenelund, Djurgården, Västerås, Hammarby. Nordgaard retired from the game in 2010 after becoming Swedish champions with his last club Hammarby.

Honours

Club 
Hammarby
 Swedish Championship: 2010

References

External links

1980 births
Living people
Swedish bandy players
Helenelunds IK players
Djurgårdens IF Bandy players
Västerås SK Bandy players
Hammarby IF Bandy players
Elitserien (bandy) players